João Titterington Gomes Cravinho (born 16 June 1964) is a Portuguese diplomat and politician who has been serving as Minister of Foreign Affairs in the government of Prime Minister António Costa since 2022. Previously, he had served as Minister of National Defence.

Career
During his time in the European External Action Service, Cravinho served as Head of the European Union's delegation to Brazil from 2015 until 2018 and India from 2011 until 2015. Prior to that, he occupied the post of Secretary of State for Foreign Affairs and Cooperation in José Sócrates's government.

Under Cravinho's leadership as Minister of National Defence, the Portuguese Air Force purchased five KC-390 military transport aircraft and a flight simulator from Brazilian aerospace company Embraer for 827 million euros ($932 million) in 2019.

In 2020, Cravinho announced Portugal's army would help Mozambique train local soldiers, marines and other forces to tackle an insurgency in Cabo Delgado. By May 2021, Cravinho and his Mozambican counterpart Jaime Neto signed an agreement in which Portugal committed to increasing its number of troops in Mozambique to 80 by 2026 and training Mozambican soldiers to tackle the insurgency, share intelligence and help the country use drones to track the militants' movements.

Education 

 1991-1995 Doctorate: D.Phil., St. Antony’s College, University of Oxford.
 Title of thesis: Modernizing Mozambique: Frelimo Ideology and the Frelimo State
 1986-1987 Master’s degree: M.Sc.(Econ), London School of Economics
 Course: Politics of the World Economy
 1983-1986 Bachelor’s degree: B.Sc.(Econ), London School of Economics
 Course: International Relations
 1980-1982 International Baccalaureate, United World College of the Atlantic

Other activities
 European Council on Foreign Relations (ECFR), Member of the Council

References

External links 
 Government of Portugal: João Gomes Cravinho, Minister of National Defence

1964 births
Living people
Ambassadors of the European Union to India
Foreign ministers of Portugal
Independent politicians in Portugal
Ministers of National Defence of Portugal
People educated at Atlantic College
Portuguese diplomats

Portuguese people of British descent